Gregory Richardson is an American football coach. He served as the head football coach at Livingstone College in Salisbury, North Carolina from 1999 to 2001 and at Virginia Union University in Richmond, Virginia in 2008.

Early life and education
Richardson graduated from Harding University High School in Charlotte, North Carolina in 1969 and then attended North Carolina Central University in Durham, North Carolina, where he lettered in football for three seasons, from 1969 to 1971.

Head coaching record

References

External links
 Winston-Salem State profile 

Year of birth missing (living people)
Living people
Buffalo Bulls football coaches
Johnson C. Smith Golden Bulls football coaches
Livingstone Blue Bears football coaches
Norfolk State Spartans football coaches
North Carolina Central Eagles football coaches
North Carolina Central Eagles football players
Virginia Union Panthers football coaches
Winston-Salem State Rams football coaches
College track and field coaches in the United States
Sportspeople from Charlotte, North Carolina
Coaches of American football from North Carolina
Players of American football from Charlotte, North Carolina
African-American coaches of American football
21st-century African-American people